Ringwood is an eastern suburb of Melbourne, Victoria, Australia,  east of Melbourne's Central Business District, located within the City of Maroondah local government area. Ringwood recorded a population of 19,144 at the 2021 census.

Ringwood has many parks and reserves, most notably, Ringwood Lake. As of July 2012, the average house price in Ringwood was $583,500 and $390,000 for a unit.

As of September 2019, the average sale price for a house in Ringwood was $866,000. For a unit, the average sale price was $533,000. The average weekly rent for a house was $435, and for a unit it was $370.

History
Ringwood village emerged in the mid to late 19th century, following the 1850s land sales. Before this, Ringwood was used primarily for agriculture. The post office opened on 2 August 1875, in the then rural area.

In 1882, the construction of the Hawthorn to Lilydale railway through the suburb caused Ringwood to emerge as a more notable town.

1924 marked major growth for Ringwood.  The railway was electrified and the township was further developed. This development boomed post war, causing the City of Ringwood to be declared in 1960.

The Ringwood clock tower was built in 1928 as a memorial to the war. After the successful post-depression subdivisions of land in the area, Ringwood was recognised to be a part of metropolitan Melbourne. Eastland Shopping Centre opened in Ringwood in 1967. It was redeveloped in the late 1990s and again in 2013. Its current state is 131,000 m2 (1,410,000 square feet) of retail and hospitality floor space, car parks and a Hoyts cinema complex.  In 2009, the owners of Eastland, Queensland Investment Corporation, planned to commence another redevelopment of the Eastland site. The Arcade near Eastland and the Ringwood Library commenced re-location in 2012. Construction on the new centre began in 2013 and was completed in two stages. Stage one opened on 29 October 2015 and stage two on 5 May 2016.

Ringwood has been the site of a Cadbury chocolate factory since the company's acquisition of MacRobertson Chocolates in 1967. The factory is the company's second largest in Australia and produces chocolate bars, such as Cherry Ripe and Boost, and Easter eggs.

In 2009, the State Government controversially approved the building of a nine-storey housing development near Ringwood Lake, without Council or public consultation.
In 2007, Ringwood became the home of ConnectEast, owner and operator of Melbourne's second toll road, EastLink.
In 2012, major retail chain store Costco announced plans to open in Ringwood. Construction is expected to finish mid-2013. It opened 20 November 2013 (Emma Hastings Maroondah Leader 20 November 2013 12:59PM)

Perhaps Ringwood's most global notoriety is the development in 1958 of the "Pride of Ringwood" hop variety, which today flavours Foster's Lager, Victoria Bitter and many other beers around the world. The hops were developed along the Mullum Mullum Creek, near the site of what later became Penguin Books, in 1963.

Demographics
In the 2016 census, the population of Ringwood was 17,471, 51.5% female and 48.5% male. The median age was 37.

62.9% of people living in Ringwood were born in Australia. The other top responses for country of birth were 5.7% China, 3.3% England, 3.2% India, 3.0% Myanmar, and 1.4% Malaysia.

67.8% of people living in Ringwood only spoke English at home. The other top languages spoken at home were 6.8% Mandarin, 2.5% Cantonese, 1.2% Zomi, 1.1% Punjabi, and 1.1% Persian (excluding Dari).

The religious makeup of Ringwood was 34.8% No religion, 18.2% Catholic, 8.5% Anglican, 7.6% Not stated, and 4.4% Baptist.

Education

Primary schools 
 Kalinda Primary School
 Mullum Primary School
 Our Lady's Ringwood

Secondary schools 
 Aquinas College
 Norwood Secondary College
 Ringwood Secondary College
 Yarra Valley Grammar

Southwood Boys' Grammar School (Site closed in 2013 and merged with Tintern Grammer in Ringwood East)

Politics and representation
In 2010, Ringwood operated a number of polling booths at the 2010 federal election, distributed mostly across the federal electorates of Deakin and Menzies, with another few allocated to Casey for pre-polling. Traditionally a relatively Liberal-leaning suburb, the combined results across all Ringwood booths produced a primary vote result of 35.7% for Labor, 47.2% for the Liberals and 12.0% for the Greens; on a two-party basis after preferences, the result was 53.02% Liberal and 46.98% Labor.

Ringwood operated a number of polling booths at the 2013 federal election, distributed mostly across the federal electorates of Deakin and Menzies. In a Liberal gain, the electorate that covers most of Ringwood, Deakin, elected Michael Sukkar with a 3.8% swing and 53.2% of the votes. In the 2016 federal election, Deakin, reelected Michael Sukkar with 55.7% of votes, and a swing of +2.5%. At the 2019 federal election, Sukkar was reelected again for Deakin with 54.7% of votes despite a swing of -1.6 against him.

For Menzies, the 2013 election saw Kevin Andrews win with 64.4% of the votes, and again in 2016 with 60.6% of the votes. He won it for a 3rd time in 2019 with 57.5% of the vote.

Sport

The suburb has three Australian rules football teams. The first is the Norwood Norsemen, who are the current Division 1 Eastern Football League (EFL) premiers, whose home ground is Mullum Reserve. The second team is the Ringwood Redbacks who play in Division 3 of the EFL, at Jubilee Park. The third is the Ringwood Jets, who play in the SFL. Their home ground is at Aquinas College.

Ringwood is also the home to Ringwood City Soccer Club. Founded in 1953, the club became the Victorian State League champions in 1959. However, the club has seen very limited success since and they now play in the Victorian State League Division 5;. The club is based at the Ringwood City Soccer Complex located at Jubilee Park.

Ringwood is further home to the Ringwood Hawks Basketball Club who play in the NBL 1. The Hawks have been a very successful team throughout its history in both senior and junior competitions. The club plays out of the Maroondah Indoor Sports Centre.

Other sporting facilities include:
 Maroondah Indoor Sports Centre
 Ringwood Public Golf Course
 Proclamation Park
 Jubilee Park
 Action Indoor Sports Centre (hosting indoor soccer, cricket, beach volleyball and netball)
 Aquanation Ringwood Regional Aquatic and Leisure Centre (opened Monday 17 August 2015)

Recreation

The Ringwood Field Naturalists Club Inc. (RFNC) is an Australian natural history and conservation organisation. The club was founded in 1961 by Jack Hyett and William (Bill) King, with other notable members, including Bruce A. Fuhrer and Fred Rogers.

The club provides an amateur forum for the study and enjoyment of natural history and travels both locally and within Victoria.

The club logo was designed in 1964 by Jack Truscott, a local artist and Foundation member and features a male golden whistler and the cinnamon wattle (Acacia leprosa), both of which were common in Ringwood in the 1960s.

Transport

Road 
Ringwood is accessible by many major roads and thoroughfares.

Some north-south arterials (from east–west) are as follows;
 Heatherdale Road
 EastLink
 New Street
 Ringwood Street/Wantirna Road
 Great Ryrie Street
 Warrandyte Road
 Kalinda Road
Some east-west arterials (from north–south) are as follows;
 Oban Road
 Ringwood Bypass
 Maroondah Highway
 Bedford Road
 Molan Street
 Reilly Street
 Canterbury Road

Train 
Two train stations serve Ringwood, both of which being on the Belgrave and Lilydale lines. The first is Heatherdale in the west near Heatherdale Road, with the other being Ringwood near Maroondah Highway between Ringwood Street and Warrandyte Road.

Bus 
Many bus routes terminate at or pass through both Ringwood and Heatherdale stations, as well as serving other areas of the suburb.

Places of interest
Ringwood includes notable places such as:
 Ringwood Magistrates' Court
 Eastland Shopping Centre
 Ringwood Railway Station
 Ringwood Clock Tower
 Realm (Ringwood Library)

Places of worship
Ringwood Christadelphians
Norwood Dawn Christadelphians
Holy Spirit Catholic Church
St. Paul's Anglican Church
Ringwood Uniting Church
First Church of Christ, Scientist, Ringwood
Ringwood Church of Christ

Notable people
Stan Beal - Australian rules footballer
Arthur Bickerton - politician
Adrian Campbell - Australian rules footballer
John Robertson Duigan - aviator
Will Fowles - politician
Miriam Knee - cricketer
Gordon Lindsay - Australian rules footballer
Joshua Simmonds - field hockey player
Billy Snedden - politician
Michael Sukkar - politician
Shurlee Swain - historian and author
Enos Thomas - Australian rules footballer

Gallery

See also
 City of Ringwood – Ringwood was previously within this former local government area.

References

External links

 Maroondah City Council
 Brief history of Ringwood
 Ringwood & District Historical Society

Suburbs of Melbourne
Ringwood, Victoria
Suburbs of the City of Maroondah